is a former Japanese football player and manager.

Playing career
Karashima was born in Kyoto on June 24, 1971. After graduating from University of Tsukuba, he joined Gamba Osaka in 1994. He became a regular player as center back from first season. However his opportunity to play decreased for injuries from 1995. In 1997, he moved to Avispa Fukuoka. However he could hardly play in the match and left the club end of 1997 season. After a blank for 10 months, in October 1998, he joined to his local club Kyoto Purple Sanga. Although he played until 1999, he could hardly play in the match. In 2000, he moved to newly was promoted to J2 League club, Mito HollyHock. Although he played as regular player in 2000, his opportunity to play decreased in 2001 and retired in September 2001.

Coaching career
After retirement, Karashima started coaching career at Kashiwa Reysol in October 2001. He coached youth team until June 2004. In 2005, he signed with Regional Leagues club Matsumoto Yamaga FC and became a manager. He managed the club until 2007. In 2008, he moved to newly was promoted to J2 League club, FC Gifu. He became a coach for top team and manager for reserve team. In 2009, he moved to Regional Leagues club Japan Soccer College and became a coach. In 2010, he became a manager and managed the club until 2012. In 2013, he returned to FC Gifu and became a coach under manager Koji Gyotoku. In August, Gyotoku was sacked and Karashima became a new manager as Gyotoku successor. In 2014, he moved to Japan Football League club Sagawa Printing Kyoto based in his local. He served as a manager. In 2015, he moved to J3 League club SC Sagamihara and managed the club until November. In 2016, he signed with L.League club Albirex Niigata Ladies. The club won the 2nd place 2016 Empress's Cup. He managed the club until 2017. In 2018, he moved to Regional Leagues club Suzuka Unlimited FC. In 2019, he signed with L.League club Mynavi Vegalta Sendai Ladies.

Club statistics

Managerial statistics

References

External links
 
 
 Profile

1971 births
Living people
University of Tsukuba alumni
Association football people from Kyoto Prefecture
Japanese footballers
J1 League players
J2 League players
Gamba Osaka players
Avispa Fukuoka players
Kyoto Sanga FC players
Mito HollyHock players
Japanese football managers
J2 League managers
J3 League managers
Matsumoto Yamaga FC managers
FC Gifu managers
SC Sagamihara managers
Association football defenders